The river Boulogne is located in western France in the départements Loire-Atlantique and Vendée.

This lake is drained by the river Acheneau towards the Loire.

References

Rivers of France
Rivers of Pays de la Loire
Pays de la Loire region articles needing translation from French Wikipedia
Rivers of Loire-Atlantique
Rivers of Vendée